Cape Charles may refer to:

Cape Charles, Virginia, a town in Northampton County, Virginia
Cape Charles (headland), headland or cape in Northampton County, Virginia

See also
 Cape St. Charles